OCBC Singapore Continental Cycling Team was a Singaporean UCI Continental cycling team managed by Justin Cheong Weiwen and sponsored by Oversea-Chinese Banking Corporation (OCBC).

Major wins
2013
Stage 3 New Zealand Cycle Classic, Jason Christie
Stage 2 Tour of Thailand, Loh Sea Keong
Stage 4 Tour de Singkarak, Loh Sea Keong
Overall Jelajah Malaysia, Loh Sea Keong
 SIN National Road Champion, Low Ji Wen
 SIN National TT Champion HO Junrong
Stage 1 Tour de Ijen, Jason Christie
2014
Critérium international d'Alger, Thomas Rabou
Stage 2 Tour International de Blida, Thomas Rabou
Stage 1 Tour International de Sétif, Ronald Yeung
Stage 1 Le Tour de Filipinas, Eric Sheppard

2014 Team roster

As of 31 December 2014.

References

External links
Official Website
OCBC Singapore Continental Cycling Team's Team List in Cycling Fever

UCI Continental Teams (Asia)
Cycling teams based in Singapore
Cycling teams established in 2012
Cycling teams disestablished in 2014